Murungakkai Chips is a 2021 Indian Tamil-language adult comedy film written and directed by debutant Srijar  and produced by Libra Productions and Firstman Film Works. The film stars Shanthanu Bhagyaraj and Athulya Ravi. The film's music and score is composed by Dharan Kumar. The film released in theatres on 10 December 2021.

Plot 

Arjun (Shanthanu Bhagyaraj) and Shanthi (Athulya Ravi) have an arranged marriage, and their first night is about to happen. Just before that, Arjun's grandfather (K. Bhagyaraj) informs him that according to their family tradition, the husband should not touch his wife on the first night, failing which he will lose his entire wealth (worth 300 crores) to an orphanage. At much about the same time, Shanthi's aunt (Urvashi) informs her that she should make sure that she has sex the very first night because women in their family who did not do so went childless. There is also the family manager Lingusamy (Manobala) and his wife (Jangiri Madhumitha), who plot against Arjun to somehow fail his grandfather so that they can take a commission from an orphanage owner. The rest of the screenplay is whether the bride or groom won their bedroom battle.

Cast 

 Shanthanu Bhagyaraj as Arjun
 Athulya Ravi as Vijaya Shanthi
 K. Bhagyaraj as Arjun's grandfather
 Urvashi as Shanti's aunt
 Manobala as Lingusamy
 Jangiri Madhumitha as Lingusamy's wife
 Yogi Babu as Saravanan
 Munishkanth as Daas
 Mayilsamy  as Kuyilsamy
 Lollu Sabha Manohar as Ganeshan
 Raju Jeyamohan as Saravanan's friend
 Ravindhar Chandrasekaran as Ulganathan
'Poo' Maila as Tulasi
Teju Ashwini

Music 

The film's soundtrack is composed by Dharan Kumar. The soundtrack album featured three songs and the audio rights were acquired by Sony Music.

Release 
The film released in theatres on 10 December 2021 and received poor reviews from critics. The movie was declared as a flop.

Reception 
Suganth of The Times of India gave a rating of 1.5 out on 5 and wrote, "For a supposedly adult comedy, the scenes inside the first night room are downright juvenile, with the conversations between the two leads hardly coming across as pillow talk." and verdict as "a flaccid adult comedy". Sify gave a rating of 1.5 out on 5 and wrote, "Murungakkai Chips is a wannabe adult comedy!".

References

External links 
 

2020s sex comedy films
Indian sex comedy films
Films scored by Dharan Kumar
2020s Tamil-language films